Floating ice may refer to:
 Drift ice, floating sea ice
 Floating Ice, a 2012 album by Michael Bisio

See also 
 Iceberg